Modi is the archaeological site of a Minoan peak sanctuary in eastern Crete.

Archaeology
Among the finds at the Modi peak sanctuary were clay human and animal figurines.

References
Jones, Donald W. 1999 Peak Sanctuaries and Sacred Caves in Minoan Crete 

Peak sanctuaries